Sixmile, also spelled Six Mile, is an unincorporated community in Bibb County, Alabama, United States.

Geography

References

Unincorporated communities in Alabama
Unincorporated communities in Bibb County, Alabama